

Squad

First-team squad

 (captain)

Competitions

Overall

Serie A

League table

Results summary

Results by round

2008-09
Tprino